Arhopala amphimuta is a species of butterfly belonging to the lycaenid family described by Cajetan Felder and Rudolf Felder in 1860. It is found in Southeast Asia - Peninsular Malaya, Sumatra, Borneo, Bangka, the Philippines (A. a. amphimuta), Thailand, Mergui, Burma, Langkawi, Penang (A. a. milleriana Corbet, 1941) and Java (A. a. quadra (Evans, 1957)).

Subspecies
Arhopala amphimuta amphimuta (Peninsular Malaya, Sumatra, Borneo, Bangka, possibly the Philippines)
Arhopala amphimuta milleriana Corbet, 1941 (Thailand, Mergui, S.Burma, Langkawi, Penang)
Arhopala amphimuta quadra (Evans, 1957) (Java)

References

External links
"Arhopala Boisduval, 1832" at Markku Savela's Lepidoptera and Some Other Life Forms. Retrieved June 7, 2017.

Arhopala
Butterflies described in 1860
Butterflies of Asia
Taxa named by Baron Cajetan von Felder
Taxa named by Rudolf Felder